Jhoulys Jose Chacín Molina (born January 7, 1988) is an American-Venezuelan professional baseball pitcher who is currently a free agent. He previously played for the Colorado Rockies, Arizona Diamondbacks, Los Angeles Angels, San Diego Padres, Milwaukee Brewers, Boston Red Sox and Atlanta Braves.

Professional career

Colorado Rockies

Chacín signed with the Colorado Rockies as an international free agent in 2004, and was considered to be one of their top prospects prior to 2009 and 2010. Chacín was called up directly to the majors from the Double-A Tulsa Drillers on July 24, 2009. In 2010, in his first full season in MLB with the Rockies, Chacín had 9 wins, a 3.28 ERA, and led all NL rookies in strikeouts with 138.

Chacín started the 2011 season as one of the best young pitchers in baseball, but after the second half of the season, he became inconsistent with his mechanics. He did, however, finish with a record of 11–14 with a 3.62 ERA in 31 starts. In 194 innings pitched, he struck out 150 batters. However, he led the National League in walks with 87. He threw his first career shutout in his first career complete game on April 15, 2011. In 2012, Chacín was limited to just 14 starts due to a pectoral injury.

In 2013, Chacín rebounded to give the Rockies a much needed lift in the rotation. He finished 14–10 with 3.47 ERA in 197.1 innings pitched. He kept the ball in the ballpark, allowing 11 home runs, 6 of which were allowed in Coors Field. Chacín began the 2014 season on the DL with shoulder inflammation. Chacín's 2014 was not good at all, as he battled through injury and inconsistency, managing to start just 11 games before being shut down for the season due to injury. His record finished at 1–7 and a career worst 5.40 ERA.

On March 22, 2015, Chacín was released by the Rockies.

Cleveland Indians
On April 14, 2015, Chacín was signed to a minor league deal by the Cleveland Indians. He was granted his release on June 18 after exercising an opt-out clause. He had a 3.21 ERA in 7 starts for the Triple-A Columbus Clippers.

Arizona Diamondbacks
On June 20, 2015, Chacín signed a minor league contract with the Arizona Diamondbacks. Towards season's end, Chacin started 4 games for the D'Backs.

Atlanta Braves
On December 14, 2015, Chacín signed a minor league contract with the Atlanta Braves. He was also given a non-roster invitation to MLB Spring training. Chacín began the 2016 season with the Gwinnett Braves of the Class AAA International League, and was promoted to the major leagues on April 12. He started 5 games for the Braves, going 1–2 with a 5.40 ERA.

Los Angeles Angels
On May 11, 2016, the Braves traded Chacín to the Los Angeles Angels for minor league pitcher Adam McCreery. Chacín began his tenure with the Angels in the rotation but was then pushed to the bullpen. He served as a swingman for the Angels, appearing in 29 games total, 17 of them starts. He finished 5–6 with 1 complete game and an ERA of 4.68 for the Angels.

San Diego Padres
On December 20, 2016, Chacín signed a one-year contract with the San Diego Padres. At the end of spring training, he was tabbed to be the Padres opening day starter. Chacín finished the year 13–10 with a 3.89 ERA and 1.27 WHIP in  innings and 153 strikeouts.

He established career highs in games started, strikeouts and strikeout per nine innings (7.64). He shared the major league lead in hit batsmen, with 14.

Milwaukee Brewers
On December 21, 2017, Chacín signed a two-year, $15.5 million contract with the Milwaukee Brewers. For the 2018 season, he went 15–8 with a 3.50 ERA and 156 strikeouts in  innings, setting career highs in wins, strikeouts, and starts (35).

Chacín got the start for 2019 opening day, March 28, against the St. Louis Cardinals, and got the win while also hitting his first major league home run, off of Miles Mikolas. Chacín was placed on the disabled list on July 25, with a right oblique strain, expected to sideline him for two to four weeks. To that point in the season, he had a 3–10 record with 5.79 ERA and 80 strikeouts in  innings. On August 24, Chacín was designated for assignment; he was released two days later.

Boston Red Sox
On August 31, 2019, Chacín signed a minor league contract with the Boston Red Sox; he was assigned to the Triple-A Pawtucket Red Sox. On September 1, the Red Sox selected his contract, adding him to their active MLB roster. He made his Red Sox debut on September 6, pitching two innings against the New York Yankees, retiring all six batters he faced including four by strikeout. With the 2019 Red Sox, Chacín appeared in six games (five starts), recording an 0–2 record with 7.36 ERA and 21 strikeouts in  innings. He became a free agent on October 31.

Minnesota Twins
On February 1, 2020, Chacín signed a minor league deal with the Minnesota Twins.
On July 19, 2020, Chacín was granted his release by the Minnesota Twins.

Second stint with Braves
On July 21, 2020, Chacín signed a one-year Major League contract with the Atlanta Braves. On August 1, the Braves designated Chacín for assignment.

New York Yankees
On January 6, 2021, the same day he became an American citizen, Chacín signed a minor league contract with the New York Yankees organization. On March 29, 2021, Chacín was released by the Yankees.

Second stint with Rockies
On April 1, 2021, Chacín signed a major league contract with the Colorado Rockies. He pitched exclusively out of the bullpen for the first time in his career, posting a 3–2 record in 46 games. On November 13, 2021, Chacín re-signed with the Rockies on a one-year, $1.25 million major league contract. After posting a 7.61 ERA in 35 games, Chacín was released by the Rockies.

Personal life
On December 1, 2010, Chacín's girlfriend Alba Iratorza gave birth to his daughter, Nicole.

On January 6, 2021, Chacín became a naturalized American citizen.

See also

 List of Major League Baseball players from Venezuela

References

External links

 
 

1988 births
Living people
Arizona Diamondbacks players
Asheville Tourists players
Atlanta Braves players
Boston Red Sox players
Casper Rockies players
Colorado Rockies players
Colorado Springs Sky Sox players
Columbus Clippers players
Dominican Summer League Rockies players
Venezuelan expatriate baseball players in the Dominican Republic
Gwinnett Braves players
Leones del Caracas players
Los Angeles Angels players
Major League Baseball pitchers
Major League Baseball players from Venezuela
Milwaukee Brewers players
Modesto Nuts players
Reno Aces players
San Diego Padres players
Sportspeople from Maracaibo
Tulsa Drillers players
Venezuelan expatriate baseball players in the United States
World Baseball Classic players of Venezuela
2013 World Baseball Classic players
2017 World Baseball Classic players
2023 World Baseball Classic players